Spanish Flu: The Forgotten Fallen is a 2009 television drama. It is a dramatization of Dr James Niven's attempts to deal with the Spanish flu, a 1918-1920 flu pandemic, in Manchester. It was written by Peter Harness and it starred Bill Paterson as Niven, along with Mark Gatiss, Kenneth Cranham and Charlotte Riley. It was first broadcast on BBC Four on 5 August 2009.

Plot
As millions of soldiers return home from the First World War, a new disease begins to sweep through Britain. Focusing on an outbreak in Manchester, its Medical Officer of Health James Niven struggles to combat the pandemic as the public, for various reasons, fail to take action.

Cast
 Bill Paterson as Dr James Niven
 Mark Gatiss as Ernest Dunks
 Charlotte Riley as Peggy Lytton
 Kenneth Cranham as MJ O'Loughlin

Reception
The series was broadcast around the time of the 2009 swine flu pandemic, which several reviews noted the timeliness of. Tim Teeman of The Times called it 'brilliantly acted and written'.

References

External links
 
 

Spanish flu in popular culture
Health in Greater Manchester
History of Manchester
History of medicine in the United Kingdom
2009 television films
2009 films
BBC television dramas
Films directed by Justin Hardy
Science docudramas
Films with screenplays by Peter Harness
British World War I films
Films about influenza outbreaks
British docudrama films
2000s British films
British drama television films